Sacristán is a Spanish surname meaning sacristan.

Notable people with this surname include:

 Andrés Sardá Sacristán (1929–2019), Spanish textile engineer and fashion designer
 Augusto Ibáñez Sacristán, Basque pelota forward player
 Emilio Sacristan Rock, Mexican inventor
 Eusebio Sacristán, Spanish football player
 Gregorio Martínez Sacristán (1946–2019), Spanish Roman Catholic bishop
 Imanol Ordorika Sacristán (born 1958), Mexican social activist
 José Sacristán, Spanish actor
 Manuel Sacristán (1925–1985), Spanish philosopher